The flag of Schleswig-Holstein is a horizontal tricolour of blue, white, and red.
Schleswig-Holstein is one of the 16 states of Germany, comprising most of the historical duchy of Holstein and the southern part of the former Duchy of Schleswig.

Overview
The flag was introduced in 1843 and banned in 1845. It was reintroduced in 1867 after the Prussian annexation of Schleswig-Holstein. It was again abolished in 1935.

After the British Military Government made Schleswig-Holstein a German state in 1946, this flag was first hoisted after some debate on 29 August 1946. It was formally established as the flag on 18 January 1957. The plain tricolour is the state's civil flag. Government authorities use the state flag (Landesdienstflagge), where the flag is defaced by the state coat of arms.

The tricolour was previously used for the Prussian province of Schleswig-Holstein (1868-1946).

It is almost identical to the flag of the former Kingdom of Yugoslavia and Serbia and Montenegro, as well as the flag of the Netherlands inverted.

Gallery

See also 

 Flags of German states

References

External links
 

Schleswig-Holstein
Flag
Schleswig-Holstein